William Vivian Talbot Gibbins (10 August 1901 – 21 November 1979) was an English amateur footballer who played as a striker.

West Ham and Clapton
Born in Forest Gate, Gibbins joined West Ham United in 1923 and made his debut as an amateur on 26 December 1923 against Aston Villa, creating the only goal of the game for Billy Moore. He decided not to play permanently for the club until the 1927–28 season. He became the first unpaid West Ham player to top the club's scoring charts in 1930–31, with 18 league goals.

Gibbins also played for Clapton, and won the FA Amateur Cup with the club in 1924 and 1925.

Brentford, Bristol Rovers, Southampton, Leyton
He transferred to Brentford on 19 February 1932, but left at the end of the season. He had spells at Bristol Rovers and Southampton before joining Leyton, where he was a losing FA Amateur Cup finalist in 1934.

Career to retirement
1934 saw Gibbins join Catford Wanderers, where he played until his retirement in 1939. Gibbins returned to The Old Spotted Dog Ground as trainer of Clapton in the 1950s and became headmaster of Harold Road school in West Ham, retiring in the early 1970s. He continued to keep his interest in the game alive by watching local schools football and making the occasional visit to the Boleyn Ground.

Legacy
The entrance to the Old Spotted Dog Ground at Disraeli Road, Newham is called the Vivian Gibbins Memorial Gate.

International career
Whilst registered with Clapton, he won two full England caps, both against France, scoring twice in a 3–1 victory on 17 May 1924 and once on 21 May 1925. Gibbins went off injured after 35 minutes of the latter game; Freddie Fox also went off after 75 minutes and England finished with nine men, but managed to hang on to win the game 3–2. He also won 12 amateur caps, scoring seven goals. Gibbins worked as a schoolmaster and was one of the last amateur footballers to feature for England.

References

External links

1901 births
1979 deaths
Footballers from Forest Gate
English footballers
Association football forwards
England international footballers
Clapton F.C. players
West Ham United F.C. players
Brentford F.C. players
Bristol Rovers F.C. players
Southampton F.C. players
Leyton F.C. players
English Football League players
England amateur international footballers